Matthew Screech (born 24 October 1992) is a Welsh rugby union player who plays for Dragons RFC as a lock forward. He is a Wales international

Screech has previously played for Pontypridd RFC and Bedwas RFC at semi-professional level.

After departing Cardiff Screech joined the Dragons for the 2013–14 season and made his debut versus Ulster 6 September 2013. After eight seasons at the Dragons, Screech returned to play for Cardiff.

Screech was called up by Wales for the 2021 July rugby union tests. He made his debut off the bench against Argentina.

On 18 November 2022, Screech rejoined the Dragons on a short term loan, as injury cover for his former team.

References

External links
Dragons profile
Cardiff profile

1992 births
Living people
Bedwas RFC players
Cardiff RFC players
Cardiff Rugby players
Dragons RFC players
Pontypridd RFC players
Rugby union players from Tonyrefail
Welsh rugby union players
Rugby union locks
Wales international rugby union players